In Ghana, Togo, Benin and other countries of West Africa, a fetish priest is a person who serves as a mediator between the spirits and the living. Fetish priests usually live and worship their gods in enclosed places, called a fetish shrine. The fetish shrine is a simple mud hut with some kind of enclosure or fence around it. The priest or priestess performs rituals to consult and seek the favor from his gods in the shrine.  The rituals are performed with money, liquor, animals, and in some places, human sex slaves called trokosi, fiashidi, or woryokwe.  The priest is usually chosen through "spiritual nomination of the shrine" through divination. They are most at times believed to help people in spiritual matters and physical needs (riches, good fortunes, marriage, traveling mercies, deliverance) in people's life. People fear them most often because fetish priests claim they can kill people spiritually.

References

Religion in Ghana
Religion in Benin
Religion in Togo
Priests
West African Vodun
Religious occupations